Gaston Renard (28 August 1869 – 20 October 1931) was a Belgian fencer. He competed in the individual épée event at the 1908 Summer Olympics.

References

1869 births
1931 deaths
Belgian male fencers
Belgian épée fencers
Olympic fencers of Belgium
Fencers at the 1908 Summer Olympics